Kathaltali is a large village (separated into two villages) located in North Dakshinbhag Union, Barlekha Upazila, Sylhet District, Bangladesh. The population of the village is 3,162 with 1,545 living in South Kathaltali and 1,617 living in North Kathaltali. North Kathaltali is in the 4th ward of the Union while South Kathaltali is in the 5th ward. It has three mosques, Kathaltali Jame Mosque, Kathaltali Taki Jame Mosque and Kathaltali Bazar Jame Mosque. Kathaltali also has one eidgah. There are two sports club in the village - the Kathaltali Cricket Club and Shonar Bangla Cricket Club.

History
The name Kathaltoli is made up of two Bengali language words. Kathal is the word for jackfruit while Toli refers to under.

In 1929, the Kathaltali Government Primary School, currently headed by AKM Ataur Rahman, was opened.

Notable people
Ebadot Hossain, cricketer

References

Barlekha Upazila
Villages in Maulvibazar District